North Brisbane was an electoral district of the Legislative Assembly in the Australian colony of Queensland from 1878 to 1888.

North Brisbane was a two-member constituency, created in 1878 by a merger of Brisbane City with one member and Wickham also with one member.

It was replaced/renamed by Brisbane North in 1888.

Members for North Brisbane

See also
 Electoral districts of Queensland
 Members of the Queensland Legislative Assembly by year
 :Category:Members of the Queensland Legislative Assembly by name

References

Former electoral districts of Queensland
1878 establishments in Australia
1888 disestablishments in Australia
Constituencies established in 1878
Constituencies disestablished in 1888